
Year 407 BC was a year of the pre-Julian Roman calendar. At the time, it was known as the Year of the Tribunate of Medullinus, Vibulanus, Volusus and Ahala (or, less frequently, year 347 Ab urbe condita). The denomination 407 BC for this year has been used since the early medieval period, when the Anno Domini calendar era became the prevalent method in Europe for naming years.

Events 
<onlyinclude>

By place

Greece 
 The Athenian general Thrasybulus recaptures Abdera and Thasos.
 The Spartan admiral Lysander refuses to be lured out of Ephesus to do battle with Alcibiades. However, while Alcibiades is away seeking supplies, the Athenian squadron is placed under the command of Antiochus, his helmsman, who is routed by the Spartan fleet (with the help of the Persians under Cyrus) in the Battle of Notium (or Ephesus).
 The defeat gives the enemies of Alcibiades an excuse to strip him of his command. He never returns again to Athens. He sails north to land he owns in the Thracian Chersonese. Except for a brief appearance at Aegospotami, Alcibiades' involvement in the Peloponnesian War is over.

Sicily 
 The exiled former leader of the moderate democrats of Syracuse, Hermocrates, is killed while attempting to force his way back into Syracuse.

Births 
 Speusippus, Greek philosopher (d. 339 BC)

Deaths 
 Hermocrates, leader of the moderate democrats of Syracuse

References